Ezequiel Arriola (born July 9, 1982 in Cordoba, Argentina) is an Argentine footballer currently playing for San Telmo of the Primera B Metropolitana in Argentina.

External links
 
 

1982 births
Living people
Argentine expatriate footballers
Argentine footballers
Club Atlético Belgrano footballers
Atlético Tucumán footballers
All Boys footballers
Juventud Antoniana footballers
Naval de Talcahuano footballers
Primera B de Chile players
Expatriate footballers in Chile
Association football midfielders
Footballers from Córdoba, Argentina